Oisín (approximately ) is an Irish male given name; meaning "fawn" or "little deer", derived from the Old Irish word  ("deer") + -ín (diminutive suffix). It is sometimes anglicized as Osheen or spelt without the diacritic (fada), as Oisin.

Variants in other languages include ,  and English: Ossian.

People with the name
Oisín Fagan (born 1973), Irish professional boxer
Oisín Gough (born 1989), Irish hurler
Oisín Kelly (1915–1981), Irish sculptor
Oisín Kelly (born 1997), Irish hurler
Oisín Mac Diarmada (born 1978), Irish fiddler
Oisín McConville (born 1975), Irish Gaelic footballer
Oisin McEntee (born 2001), Irish footballer
Oisín McGann (born 1973), Irish writer and illustrator
Oisín Mullin (born 2000), Irish footballer
Oisin Murphy (born 1995), Irish jockey
Oisín Quinn (born 1969), Irish politician
Oisín Stack, Irish actor

See also
List of Irish-language given names

Irish-language masculine given names
Irish masculine given names
Given names
Ancient Ireland
Old Irish
Fenian Cycle